Fyfield is a small hamlet about  east of Pewsey, Wiltshire, England.

It is to be distinguished from the larger village of Fyfield, three miles west of Marlborough, also in Wiltshire; the two places are only about six miles apart.  It should also be distinguished from the hamlet of Fifield, Wiltshire, which is in the parish of Enford about six miles south of Pewsey.

Fyfield is a tithing of the parish of Milton Lilbourne.  It is typical of the strip tithings on the northern edge of Salisbury Plain: it extends from the greensand on the valley floor to the chalk downland of Fyfield Hill (confusingly also known as Fyfield Down, but to be distinguished from Fyfield Down on the Marlborough Downs, near the other Fyfield).

Fyfield Manor has parts which date back to the 15th century and is Grade I listed.  It was the home of Sir Anthony Eden in the 1960s, then sold in 1966 to Charles Morrison.

References

External links

A history of Milton Lilbourne, by John Chandler
 

Hamlets in Wiltshire
Country houses in Wiltshire